Eshkanan Rural District is a rural district (dehestan) in Eshkanan District, Lamerd County, Fars Province, Iran. At the 2006 census, its population was 3,813, in 829 families.  The rural district has 16 villages.

References 

Rural Districts of Fars Province
Lamerd County